is a town in Miyagi Prefecture, Japan. , it had an estimated population of 12,516, and a population density of 77 persons per km² in 4504 households. It is a resort town on a coastline of wooded islands and mountainous inlets, large sections of which suffered from damage due to the 2011 Tōhoku earthquake and tsunami.

Geography
Minamisanriku is in the far northeastern corner of Miyagi Prefecture. Its coastline is part of the Sanriku Fukkō National Park, which stretches north to Aomori Prefecture. The town is bordered to the north, west, and south by the Kitakami Mountains. About 70% of the area of the town is forested.

Climate
Minamisanriku has a humid climate (Köppen climate classification Cfa) characterized by warm humid summers and cold winters.

Neighboring municipalities
Miyagi Prefecture
Kesennuma
Tome
Ishinomaki

Demographics
Per Japanese census data, the population of Minamisanriku peaked in the 1950s and has declined steadily over the past 70 years.

History
The area of present-day Minamisanriku was part of ancient Mutsu Province and came under the control of the Date clan of Sendai Domain during the Edo period, under the Tokugawa shogunate. The area has suffered from the effects of tsunami since ancient times, including the 869 Sanriku earthquake, and more recently during the 1896 Sanriku earthquake and the 1933 Sanriku earthquake.

The villages of Shizugawa and Utatsu were established on June 1, 1889 with the establishment of the modern municipalities system. Shizugawa was elevated to town status on October 31, 1895 and Utatsu on April 1, 1959. The town was formed through a merger on October 1, 2005, when the towns of Shizugawa and Utatsu, both from Motoyoshi District, merged to form the new town of Minamisanriku.

As a result, two-story-high harbor walls were built by 1963, and residents held tsunami drills each year on the anniversary. To mark the 30th anniversary of the disaster in 1990, a bilingual Spanish-Japanese plaque was installed, with a message from President Patricio Aylwin of Chile, accompanied by a replica moai statue.

The harbor walls proved ineffective in the 2011 tsunami, which washed over four-story buildings.

The 2010 Chile earthquake caused a  tsunami in Minamisanriku.

2011 earthquake and tsunami disaster

Immediate aftermath accounts suggested 95 percent of the town was destroyed by the 2011 Japanese tsunami that followed the 2011 Tōhoku earthquake. Only the tallest buildings remained, and roughly half the population was unaccounted for during the days following the disaster; only 9,700 people were confirmed alive and evacuated in the first week. In late June 2011, a total of 1,206 were counted as dead or missing, according to the Kahoku Shinpou.

The town had two evacuation centers where residents could go in the event of a tsunami, one on the southern headland overlooking the town, the other back from the center of the town. Although both were 20 meters above sea level, the tsunami inundated them and washed people away. At least 31 of the town's 80 designated evacuation sites were inundated by the tsunami.

According to an English teacher at the high school on a hill above the tsunami, "The entire town was simply swept away. It just no longer exists. There were around 7,000 of us on the hill that day. Perhaps a few thousand at the school on the hill opposite. But there are 17,000 in the town. All the others have gone." Since the schools were all on high ground, many children were orphaned. Survivors wrote "SOS" in white lettering, in the playing field of Shizugawa High School.

When the earthquake struck, the mayor, Jin Sato (佐藤仁), was talking at the town assembly about the much smaller tsunami caused by the March 9 foreshock of the March 11 earthquake. The three-story building of the town's  which Sato escaped to was submerged by the tsunami. Out of the 130 people who worked at the town hall, Sato was one of 53 who reached the roof and one of 10 who survived.  He returned to government affairs, founding the headquarters for disaster control at the Bayside Arena in Miyagi on March 13, 2011.

Shizugawa Hospital was one of the few major buildings that survived the tsunami. It was partly inundated, and 74 out of 109 patients died. Close to 200 people were rescued from the roof.

Miki Endo, a 25-year-old employed by the town's Crisis Management Department to voice disaster advisories and warnings, was hailed in the Japanese news media as a heroine for sacrificing her life by continuing to broadcast warnings and alerts over the community loudspeaker system, in the Crisis Management Department's building, as the tsunami overwhelmed it. She was credited with saving many lives. The three-story headquarters of the department remained standing but was completely gutted, with only a red-colored steel skeleton remaining. In the aftermath of the disaster, Endo was missing and was later confirmed to have died. Photos show the roof of the building completely submerged at the height of the inundation, with some people clinging to the rooftop antenna. The surviving steel frame, with bent sections being kept intact as a reminder of the damage the building sustained, has been preserved during the city's recovery. A new sea wall is also currently under construction in Minamisanriku, and other landmarks, such as the town's seafood market, have also been rebuilt. The market was one of the first amenities in the town to reopen, initially in a temporary location inside a large tent; as much of the town's fishing fleet was damaged, destroyed or swept away by the tsunami, residents banded together, sharing supplies and boats as part of a joint effort to resume the town's fishing industry.

International response
The town is the site of the first field hospital established by an outside nation offering assistance following the disaster. An initial team of five doctors from Israel set up a surgery in preparation for a larger team once needs were assessed. A 53-member delegation of medical personnel from the Home Front Command and the IDF's Medical Corps opened a field hospital near Minamisanriku on March 29. The clinic included surgical, pediatrics and maternity wards, and an intensive care unit, pharmacy and laboratory along with 62 tons of medical supplies. The clinic was active in treating patients immediately upon opening.

On 23 April 2011, the Prime Minister of Australia, Julia Gillard, visited Minamisanriku.

Economy
Minamisanriku relies heavily on tourism and commercial fishing as mainstays of the local economy.

Education
Minamisanriku has five public elementary schools and two public middle schools operated by the town government and one public high school operated by the Miyagi Prefectural Board of Education.

Transportation

Railway
 East Japan Railway Company (JR East) - Kesennuma Line (Suspended indefinitely and replace by a BRT service) 
   -  - -  -  -

Highway

Local attractions
 Mount Tatsugane
 Tubakishima (National Natural Monument)
 Daio-ji, Buddhist temple

Sister/friendship cities
  Besano, Lombardy, Italy, since November 7, 1999
  Shōnai, Yamagata, Japan, since October 13, 1999

References

External links

Official Website 

Towns in Miyagi Prefecture
Populated coastal places in Japan
Minamisanriku, Miyagi